The Secret Policeman's Ball 2006 was a show staged as a benefit for human rights organization Amnesty International at London's Royal Albert Hall in October 2006. Its title was a conscious reprise of the title of the 1979 Amnesty benefit show that heralded the organization's breakthrough in public awareness and fundraising.  The 1979 show The Secret Policeman's Ball, organised by John Cleese and producers Martin Lewis and Peter Walker, led to greater participation by comedians and rock musicians in further benefit shows for Amnesty and other social and political causes.  It also led to the series of benefit shows that are informally known as The Secret Policeman's Balls.

The 2006 show was coordinated by British comedian Eddie Izzard.  Internationally-known performers Izzard and actor Richard E. Grant were joined by locally-popular comedic talents including Russell Brand, Jon Culshaw, Al Murray, The Mighty Boosh and Omid Djalili. American comedic actor Chevy Chase made a cameo appearance in one skit.  Music was supplied by The Zutons and The Magic Numbers.  Singer Natalie Imbruglia appeared in a routine alongside David Armand spoofing her hit song "Torn".  The show also featured a series of computer-generated animations highlighting global political issues, including the American detention centre at Guantanamo Bay and the international arms trade.

Certain high-profile performers such as Jennifer Saunders and Ian McKellen previously advertised on Amnesty's website as confirmed participants did not appear in the show, but participated as voice actors in some of the animations shown throughout.

The 4-hour show was videotaped and 70 minutes of highlights were broadcast by Britain's Channel Four station on October 31, 2006.   A DVD was released on 4 December with a duration of 199 minutes plus 83 minutes of extra material. Included in the 'extras' section were some of the animations from the show itself. There was also a series of "cinecasts" in which the Royal Albert Hall event was shown live in 17 cinemas in major British cities.

Several reviews in the UK media considered that, with a few exceptions, the performances and material were not of the highest calibre and did not compare to the quality of the original shows from the late 1970s and early 1980s. The critical comments were tempered by references to the fact that the event was held for a good cause; Chortle.co.uk wrote that "a charity gig is much like the infants’ Nativity play, successful in its own terms and not deserving of too much harsh scrutiny."

List of performers

Solo comedic performers
Al Murray
Andrew Maxwell
Dylan Moran
Eddie Izzard
Russell Brand
Sarah Silverman
Jon Culshaw

Performers in comedy skits
Ronni Ancona
David Armand
Jo Brand
Chevy Chase
Omid Djalili
Julia Davis
Jimmy Fallon
Nitin Ganatra
Richard E Grant
Seth Green
Shobna Gulati
Rhys Ifans
Natalie Imbruglia
Graham Norton
Jessica Stevenson
Shaun Williamson
Kate Isitt

Comedy ensembles
The Mighty Boosh (Julian Barratt and Noel Fielding)
Cast of Green Wing (Tamsin Greig, Stephen Mangan, Julian Rhind-Tutt and Michelle Gomez)

Musical performers
The Magic Numbers and Martha Wainwright
The Zutons
Natalie Imbruglia

Other participants
Jeremy Irons (speaking about Amnesty)

References

External links
Amnesty International's Secret Policeman's Ball site
Amnesty's announcement of the new show

UK news story about the new show
US news story about the new show
BBC News Story and audio clip

Amnesty International
2006 in the United Kingdom
2006 in London
British comedy
Events at the Royal Albert Hall
October 2006 events in the United Kingdom